Uchumi Supermarkets, often referred to simply as Uchumi, is a Kenyan supermarket chain. The word  means "economy" in Swahili.

Overview
Uchumi is headquartered in Kenya. , Uchumi is one of a number of Kenyan supermarket chains that serve Kenya, including market-leaders Naivas and Quick Mart and Carrefour. In June 2014, the company's assets were about US$78.8 million (KES:6.885 billion), with shareholder equity of approximately US$38.4 million (KES:3.357 billion). By December 2020 there were only three stores in Kenya.

History
The company was founded in 1975, as a public limited liability company, by three Kenyan parastatal companies: Industrial and Commercial Development Corporation, Kenya Wine Agencies Limited (KWAL), and Kenya National Trading Corporation. The main objective at the time was to create outlets for the equitable distribution of commodities and to create retail outlets for Kenyan manufactures. In 1976, Uchumi's shareholders signed a management contract with Standa SPA, an Italian supermarket chain, to train Kenyans to run the new enterprise. The shares of the company stock were listed on the Nairobi Stock Exchange (NSE) in 1992.

Uchumi closed down, albeit temporarily, and was placed in receivership during June 2006 after 30 years of business. It was simultaneously de-listed from the NSE. At the time, its closure was described as "one of the greatest corporate disasters in independent Kenya history". A government-led rescue plan, however, was initiated and consequently five Uchumi outlets, all in Nairobi, were reopened on 15 July 2006 under interim management and a caretaker administrator.

By January 2011, the retail chain had returned to profitability and applied to the Kenya Capital Markets Authority to re-list its shares on the NSE. Approval to re-list on the NSE was granted in May 2011 and trading in the shares of Uchumi resumed on 31 May 2011.

Ownership
, the shares of stock of the retail chain are listed on the NSE, where they trade under the symbol "UCHM". The shares are also cross-listed on the Rwanda Stock Exchange and the Uganda Securities Exchange. The company obtained regulatory approval to cross-list on the Dar es Salaam Stock Exchange, effective 15 August 2014. The six largest shareholders in the company as of April 2015 were:

Branches
, the supermarket chain maintained Six outlets in Kenya:

List of Branches in Kenya
List of Uchumi branches in Kenya:
 Langata Branch – Nairobi
 Nairobi West Branch –  Nairobi
 Ngong Road Branch (Adams) – Nairobi
In 2015 Uchumi had 37 stores. 34 stores have closed down.

Closure of non-Kenyan stores
In June 2015, Uchumi fired its chief executive officer and chief financial officer at the time, for "misconduct and gross negligence". In July 2015, the company hired a Nairobi-based consulting firm to probe employee theft at the retail chain. In August 2015, a new CEO was hired. In October 2015, the store chain closed down all its stores in Uganda and Tanzania, citing unprofitability. In the process, 900 former employees were laid off in both countries, of whom 400 were in Uganda.

See also

 East African Community
 Economy of Kenya
 List of supermarket chains in Kenya
 List of supermarket chains in Africa

References

External links

Uchumi Stock Quote At Reuters.com
Uchumi Resumes Trading At The Nairobi Stock Exchange
 Uchumi Appoints Jamii Bora Chief To Its Board
 Uchumi Supermarkets shuts down four outlets
Uchumi sacks 900 Uganda, Tanzania staff, closes all stores outside Kenya

Supermarkets of Kenya
Retail companies established in 1975
Companies listed on the Nairobi Securities Exchange
Companies listed on the Uganda Securities Exchange
Kenyan companies established in 1975